Kadir Caidi (born 17 July 1990) is an Italian footballer who plays as a defender.

Career

Early career
Born in Ravenna, Romagna, Kadir Caidi started his professional career at Romagna club A.C. Cesena along with his brother Nebil. K.Caidi was a member of Cesena U16 team for 2005–06 Emilia–Romagna student league. He was promoted to U17 team (Allievi) for national student league in 2006–07 season. K.Caidi was the member of the reserve B in Berretti reserve league in 2007–08 season. Reserve A and B merged in 2008–09 season, as Cesena first team was relegated at the end of 2007–08 Serie B, thus the reserve A was no longer eligible to national "spring" league. K.Caidi remained in the reserve for 2008–09 season. He followed the reserve returned to the spring league in 2009–10 season, but only played 15 times.

Caidi spent 2010–11 Lega Pro Seconda Divisione in Valenzana after he was graduated from the U20 reserve. K.Caidi made 11 appearances in his maiden season.

Bologna–Cesena swap
On 29 June 2011, one day before the closure of 2010–11 financial year, Cesena formed two swap deals with Bologna F.C. 1909, which K.Caidi was transferred to the capital of Emilia along with Angelo Gregorio in co-ownership deal for €750,000 and €1 million respectively. At the same time, Jacopo Luppi and Giacomo Bassoli moved to Romagna in the same formula. The all four players signed a 3-year contract, which both K.Caidi and Gregorio had an annual wage of €28,757 each, which barely above minimum wage. The deal made both club benefited financially in short term but no effect with the strength of the squad.

Lega Pro loans
K.Caidi left for Italian fourth division newcomer Santarcangelo in July 2011, along with Gregorio (both from Bologna/Cesena), G.Bassoli (from Cesena/Bologna), Simone Tonelli (from Vicenza/Cesena), Nicola Del Pivo, Rivolino Gavoci and Daniele Ferri (Cesena only).

In January 2012 he was exchanged with Cesena teammate Michele Gabbianelli, who went on loan to Bellaria in the first half of the season. K.Caidi re-joined former Cesena teammate Marcello Scarponi and Thomas Fabbri (from Parma/Cesena), as well as met J.Luppi in Bellaria. The team was coached by the brother of Cesena president Nicola Campedelli.

In August 2012 Caidi left for Giacomense. Caidi was suspended in round 4 (23 September) due to his second caution (and subsequent sent off) on round 3, his second appearance for the team. He was booked again in round 8, his fourth game for Giacomense. Caidi played once more time for Giacomense in round 8 (2 December) before he was released in January 2013.

In June 2013 both clubs gave up the remain 50% registration rights.

Footnotes

References

External links
 FIGC 
 Football.it Profile 

Italian footballers
A.C. Cesena players
Valenzana Mado players
Bologna F.C. 1909 players
Santarcangelo Calcio players
A.C. Bellaria Igea Marina players
A.C. Giacomense players
Association football defenders
Italy youth international footballers
Serie C players
Sportspeople from Ravenna
1990 births
Living people
Footballers from Emilia-Romagna